The 1980 United States presidential election was the 49th quadrennial presidential election, held on Tuesday, November 4, 1980. The Republican ticket of Ronald Reagan and George H. W. Bush defeated incumbent Democratic president Jimmy Carter and incumbent vice president Walter Mondale in a landslide victory. As of 2023, this is the most recent election in which a Democratic president lost reelection.

Carter's unpopularity and poor relations with Democratic leaders encouraged an unsuccessful intra-party challenge by United States senator Ted Kennedy. Meanwhile, the Republican primaries were contested between former California governor Reagan, former Central Intelligence Agency director George H. W. Bush, United States congressman John B. Anderson, and several other candidates. All of Reagan's opponents had dropped out by the end of the primaries, and the Republicans nominated a ticket consisting of Reagan and Bush.

Anderson entered the general election as an independent candidate with former Wisconsin governor Patrick Lucey serving as his running mate. Reagan campaigned for increased defense spending, implementation of supply-side economic policies, and a balanced budget. His campaign was aided by Democratic dissatisfaction with Carter, the Iran hostage crisis, and a worsening economy at home marked by stagflation. Carter attacked Reagan as a dangerous right-wing extremist, and warned that Reagan would cut Medicare and Social Security.

On Election Day, Reagan won the election by a landslide, taking 489 votes in the Electoral College and 50.8% of the popular vote with a margin of 9.7%. Reagan received the highest number of electoral votes ever won by a non-incumbent presidential candidate. In the simultaneous congressional elections, Republicans won control of the United States Senate for the first time since 1952. Carter won 41% of the vote, but carried just six states and Washington, D.C. Anderson won 6.6% of the popular vote, and he performed best among liberal Republican voters dissatisfied with Reagan. Due to the rise of conservatism following Reagan's victory, historians have considered the election to be a political realignment that began with Barry Goldwater's presidential campaign in 1964, and the 1980 election marked the start of the Reagan era.

Background

Throughout the 1970s, the United States underwent a wrenching period of low economic growth, high inflation and interest rates, and intermittent energy crises. By October 1978, Iran—a major oil supplier to the United States at the time—was experiencing a major uprising that severely damaged its oil infrastructure and greatly weakened its capability to produce oil. In January 1979, shortly after Iran's leader Shah Mohammad Reza Pahlavi fled the country, Iranian opposition figure Ayatollah Ruhollah Khomeini ended his 14-year exile in France and returned to Iran to establish an Islamic Republic, largely hostile to American interests and influence in the country. In the spring and summer of 1979, inflation was on the rise and various parts of the United States were experiencing energy shortages.

Carter was widely blamed for the return of the long gas lines in the summer of 1979 that was last seen just after the 1973 Yom Kippur War. He planned on delivering his fifth major speech on energy, but he felt that the American people were no longer listening. Carter left for the presidential retreat of Camp David. "For more than a week, a veil of secrecy enveloped the proceedings. Dozens of prominent Democratic Party leaders—members of Congress, governors, labor leaders, academics and clergy—were summoned to the mountaintop retreat to confer with the beleaguered president." His pollster, Pat Caddell, told him that the American people simply faced a crisis of confidence because of the assassinations of John F. Kennedy, Robert F. Kennedy and Martin Luther King Jr.; the Vietnam War; and Watergate. On July 15, 1979, Carter gave a nationally televised address in which he identified what he believed to be a "crisis of confidence" among the American people. This came to be known as his "Malaise speech", although Carter never used the word in the speech.

Many expected Senator Ted Kennedy to successfully challenge Carter in the upcoming Democratic primary. Kennedy's official announcement was scheduled for early November. A television interview with Roger Mudd of CBS a few days before the announcement went badly, however. Kennedy gave an "incoherent and repetitive" answer to the question of why he was running, and the polls, which showed him leading the President by 58–25 in August now had him ahead 49–39.

Meanwhile, Carter was given an opportunity for political redemption when the Khomeini regime again gained public attention and allowed the taking of 52 American hostages by a group of Islamist students and militants at the U.S. embassy in Tehran on November 4, 1979. Carter's calm approach towards the handling of this crisis resulted in his approval ratings jump in the 60-percent range in some polls, due to a "rally round the flag" effect.

By the beginning of the election campaign, the prolonged Iran hostage crisis had sharpened public perceptions of a national crisis. On April 25, 1980, Carter's ability to use the hostage crisis to regain public acceptance eroded when his high risk attempt to rescue the hostages ended in disaster when eight servicemen were killed. The unsuccessful rescue attempt drew further skepticism towards his leadership skills.

Following the failed rescue attempt, Carter took overwhelming blame for the Iran hostage crisis, in which the followers of the Ayatollah Khomeini burned American flags and chanted anti-American slogans, paraded the captured American hostages in public, and burned Carter in effigy. Carter's critics saw him as an inept leader who had failed to solve the worsening economic problems at home. His supporters defended the president as a decent, well-intentioned man being unfairly criticized for problems that had been escalating for years.

When the Soviet Union invaded Afghanistan in late 1979, Carter seized international leadership in rallying opposition. He cut off American grain sales, which hurt Soviet consumers and annoyed American farmers. In terms of prestige, the Soviets were deeply hurt by the large-scale boycott of their 1980 Summer Olympics. Furthermore Carter began secret support of the opposition forces in Afghanistan that successfully tied down the Soviet army for a decade.  The effect was to end détente and reopen the Cold War.

Nominations

Republican Party

Other major candidates 
The following candidates were frequently interviewed by major broadcast networks and cable news channels, were listed in publicly published national polls, or had held a public office. Reagan received 7,709,793 votes in the primaries.

Former governor Ronald Reagan of California was the odds-on favorite to win his party's nomination for president after nearly beating incumbent President Gerald Ford just four years earlier. Reagan dominated the primaries early, driving from the field Senate Minority Leader Howard Baker from Tennessee, former governor John Connally of Texas, Senator Robert Dole from Kansas, Representative Phil Crane from Illinois, and Representative John Anderson from Illinois, who dropped out of the race to run as an Independent. George H. W. Bush from Texas posed the strongest challenge to Reagan with his victories in the Pennsylvania and Michigan primaries, but it was not enough to turn the tide. Reagan won the nomination on the first round at the 1980 Republican National Convention in Detroit, Michigan, in July, then chose Bush (his top rival) as his running mate. Reagan, Bush, and Dole would all go on to be the nominees in the next four elections. (Reagan in 1984, Bush in 1988 and 1992, and Dole in 1996)

Democratic Party

Other major candidates 
The following candidates were frequently interviewed by major broadcast networks, were listed in published national polls, or had held public office. Carter received 10,043,016 votes in the primaries.

The three major Democratic candidates in early 1980 were incumbent President Jimmy Carter, Senator Ted Kennedy of Massachusetts, and Governor Jerry Brown of California. Brown withdrew on April 2. Carter and Kennedy faced off in 34 primaries. Not counting the 1968 election in which Lyndon Johnson withdrew his candidacy, this was the most tumultuous primary race that an elected incumbent president had encountered since President Taft, during the highly contentious election of 1912.

During the summer of 1980, there was a short-lived "Draft Muskie" movement; Secretary of State Edmund Muskie was seen as a favorable alternative to a deadlocked convention. One poll showed that Muskie would be a more popular alternative to Carter than Kennedy, implying that the attraction was not so much to Kennedy as to the fact that he was not Carter. Muskie was polling even with Ronald Reagan at the time, while Carter was seven points behind. Although the underground "Draft Muskie" campaign failed, it became a political legend.

After defeating Kennedy in 24 of 34 primaries, Carter entered the party's convention in New York in August with 60 percent of the delegates pledged to him on the first ballot. Still, Kennedy refused to drop out. At the convention, after a futile last-ditch attempt by Kennedy to alter the rules to free delegates from their first-ballot pledges, Carter was renominated with 2,129 votes to 1,146 for Kennedy. Vice President Walter Mondale was also renominated. In his acceptance speech, Carter warned that Reagan's conservatism posed a threat to world peace and progressive social welfare programs from the New Deal to the Great Society.

Other candidates 

John B. Anderson was defeated in the Republican primaries, but entered the general election as an independent candidate. He campaigned as a liberal Republican alternative to Reagan's conservatism. Anderson's campaign appealed primarily to frustrated anti-Carter voters from Republican and Democratic backgrounds. Despite maintaining the support of millions of liberal, pro-ERA, anti-Reagan and anti-Carter voters all the way up to election day to finish third with 5.7 million votes, Anderson's poll ratings had ebbed away through the campaign season as many of his initial supporters were pulled away by Carter and Reagan. Anderson's running mate was Patrick Lucey, a Democratic former Governor of Wisconsin and then ambassador to Mexico, appointed by President Carter.

The Libertarian Party nominated Ed Clark for president and David Koch for vice president. They received almost one million votes and were on the ballot in all 50 states plus Washington, D.C. Koch, a co-owner of Koch Industries, pledged part of his personal fortune to the campaign. The Libertarian Party platform was the only political party in 1980 to contain a plank advocating for the equal rights of homosexual men and women as well as the only party platform to advocate explicitly for "amnesty" for all illegal non-citizens. The platform was also unique in favoring the repeal of the National Labor Relations Act, all state Right to Work laws, Medicare, Medicaid, and “the increasingly oppressive” Social Security. Clark emphasized his support for an end to the war on drugs. He advertised his opposition to the draft and wars of choice.

The Clark–Koch ticket received 921,128 votes (1.1% of the total nationwide), finishing in fourth place nationwide. This was the highest overall number of votes earned by a Libertarian candidate until the 2012 election, when Gary Johnson and James P. Gray became the first Libertarian ticket to earn more than a million votes, albeit with a lower overall vote percentage than Clark–Koch. The 1980 total remained the highest percentage of popular votes a Libertarian Party candidate received in a presidential race until Johnson and William Weld received 3.3% of the popular vote in 2016. Clark's strongest support was in Alaska, where he came in third place with 11.7% of the vote, finishing ahead of Independent candidate John B. Anderson and receiving almost half as many votes as Jimmy Carter.

The Socialist Party USA nominated David McReynolds for president and Sister Diane Drufenbrock for vice president, making McReynolds the first openly gay man to run for president and Drufenbrock the first nun to be a candidate for national office in the U.S.

The Citizens Party ran biologist Barry Commoner for president and Comanche Native American activist LaDonna Harris for vice president. The Commoner–Harris ticket was on the ballot in twenty-nine states and in the District of Columbia.

The Communist Party USA ran Gus Hall for president and Angela Davis for vice president.

The American Party nominated Percy L. Greaves Jr. for president and Frank L. Varnum for vice president.

Rock star Joe Walsh ran a mock campaign as a write-in candidate, promising to make his song "Life's Been Good" the new national anthem if he won, and running on a platform of "Free Gas For Everyone." Though the 33-year-old Walsh was not old enough to actually assume the office, he wanted to raise public awareness of the election.

General election

Campaign
The 1980 election marked a political realignment, with Reagan gaining in former Democratic strongholds such as the South and white ethnics (dubbed "Reagan Democrats.") Reagan exuded upbeat optimism. David Frum says Carter ran an attack-based campaign based on "despair and pessimism" which "cost him the election." Carter emphasized his record as a peacemaker, and said Reagan's election would threaten civil rights and social programs that stretched back to the New Deal. Reagan's platform also emphasized the importance of peace, as well as a prepared self-defense.

Immediately after the conclusion of the primaries, a Gallup poll held that Reagan was ahead, with 58% of voters upset by Carter's handling of the Presidency. One analysis of the election has suggested that "Both Carter and Reagan were perceived negatively by a majority of the electorate." While the three leading candidates (Reagan, Anderson and Carter) were religious Christians, Carter had the most support of evangelical Christians according to a Gallup poll. However, in the end, Jerry Falwell's Moral Majority lobbying group is credited with giving Reagan two-thirds of the white evangelical vote. According to Carter: "that autumn [1980] a group headed by Jerry Falwell purchased $10 million in commercials on southern radio and TV to brand me as a traitor to the South and no longer a Christian."

The election of 1980 was a key turning point in American politics. It signaled the new electoral power of the suburbs and the Sun Belt. Reagan's success as a conservative would initiate a realigning of the parties, as liberal Republicans and conservative Democrats would either leave politics or change party affiliations through the 1980s and 1990s to leave the parties much more ideologically polarized. While during Barry Goldwater's 1964 campaign, many voters saw his warnings about a too-powerful government as hyperbolic and only 30% of the electorate agreed that government was too powerful, by 1980 a majority of Americans believed that government held too much power.

Promises
Reagan promised a restoration of the nation's military strength, at the same time 60% of Americans polled felt defense spending was too low. Reagan also promised an end to "trust me government" and to restore economic health by implementing a supply-side economic policy. Reagan promised a balanced budget within three years (which he said would be "the beginning of the end of inflation"), accompanied by a 30% reduction in tax rates over those same years. With respect to the economy, Reagan famously said, "A recession is when your neighbor loses his job. A depression is when you lose yours. And recovery is when Jimmy Carter loses his." Reagan also criticized the "windfall profit tax" that Carter and Congress enacted that year in regards to domestic oil production and promised to attempt to repeal it as president. The tax was not a tax on profits, but on the difference between the price control-mandated price and the market price.

On the issue of women's rights there was much division, with many feminists frustrated with Carter, the only major-party candidate who supported the Equal Rights Amendment. After a bitter Convention fight between Republican feminists and antifeminists the Republican Party dropped their forty-year endorsement of the ERA. Reagan, however, announced his dedication to women's rights and his intention to, if elected, appoint women to his cabinet and the first female justice to the Supreme Court. He also pledged to work with all 50 state governors to combat discrimination against women and to equalize federal laws as an alternative to the ERA. Reagan was convinced to give an endorsement of women's rights in his nomination acceptance speech.

Carter was criticized by his own aides for not having a "grand plan" for the recovery of the economy, nor did he ever make any campaign promises; he often criticized Reagan's economic recovery plan, but did not create one of his own in response.

Events
 
In August, after the Republican National Convention, Ronald Reagan gave a campaign speech at the annual Neshoba County Fair on the outskirts of Philadelphia, Mississippi, where three civil rights workers were murdered in 1964. He was the first presidential candidate ever to campaign at the fair. Reagan famously announced, "Programs like education and others should be turned back to the states and local communities with the tax sources to fund them. I believe in states' rights. I believe in people doing as much as they can at the community level and the private level." Reagan also stated, "I believe we have distorted the balance of our government today by giving powers that were never intended to be given in the Constitution to that federal establishment." He went on to promise to "restore to states and local governments the power that properly belongs to them." President Carter criticized Reagan for injecting "hate and racism" by the "rebirth of code words like 'states' rights'".

Two days later, Reagan appeared at the Urban League convention in New York, where he said, "I am committed to the protection and enforcement of the civil rights of black Americans. This commitment is interwoven into every phase of the plans I will propose." He then said that he would develop "enterprise zones" to help with urban renewal.

The media's main criticism of Reagan centered on his gaffes. When Carter kicked off his general election campaign in Tuscumbia, Reagan—referring to the Southern U.S. as a whole—claimed that Carter had begun his campaign in the birthplace of the Ku Klux Klan. In doing so, Reagan seemed to insinuate that the KKK represented the South, which caused many Southern governors to denounce Reagan's remarks. Additionally, Reagan was widely ridiculed by Democrats for saying that trees caused pollution; he later said that he meant only certain types of pollution and his remarks had been misquoted.

Meanwhile, Carter was burdened by a continued weak economy and the Iran hostage crisis. Inflation, high interest rates, and unemployment continued through the course of the campaign, and the ongoing hostage crisis in Iran became, according to David Frum in How We Got Here: The '70s, a symbol of American impotence during the Carter years. John Anderson's independent candidacy, aimed at eliciting support from liberals, was also seen as hurting Carter more than Reagan, especially in reliably Democratic states such as Massachusetts and New York.

Presidential debates

The League of Women Voters, which had sponsored the 1976 Ford/Carter debate series, announced that it would do so again for the next cycle in the spring of 1979. However, Carter was not eager to participate with any debate. He had repeatedly refused to a debate with Senator Edward M. Kennedy during the primary season, and had given ambivalent signals as to his participation in the fall.

The League of Women Voters had announced a schedule of debates similar to 1976, three presidential and one vice presidential. No one had much of a problem with this until it was announced that Rep. John B. Anderson might be invited to participate along with Carter and Reagan. Carter steadfastly refused to participate with Anderson included, and Reagan refused to debate without him. It took months of negotiations for the League of Women Voters to finally put it together. It was held on September 21, 1980, in the Baltimore Convention Center. Reagan said of Carter's refusal to debate: "He [Carter] knows that he couldn't win a debate even if it were held in the Rose Garden before an audience of Administration officials with the questions being asked by Jody Powell." The League of Women Voters promised the Reagan campaign that the debate stage would feature an empty chair to represent the missing president. Carter was very upset about the planned chair stunt, and at the last minute convinced the league to take it out. The debate was moderated by Bill Moyers. Anderson, who many thought would handily dispatch Reagan, managed only a narrow win, according to many in the media at that time, with Reagan putting up a much stronger performance than expected. Despite the narrow win in the debate, Anderson, who had been as high as 20% in some polls, and at the time of the debate was over 10%, dropped to about 5% soon after, although Anderson got back up to winning 6.6% of the vote on election day. In the debate, Anderson failed to substantively engage Reagan enough on their social issue differences and on Reagan's advocation of supply-side economics. Anderson instead started off by criticizing Carter: "Governor Reagan is not responsible for what has happened over the last four years, nor am I. The man who should be here tonight to respond to those charges chose not to attend," to which Reagan added: "It's a shame now that there are only two of us here debating, because the two that are here are in more agreement than disagreement." In one moment in the debate, Reagan commented on a rumor that Anderson had invited Senator Ted Kennedy to be his running mate by asking the candidate directly, "John, would you really prefer Teddy Kennedy to me?"

As September turned into October, the situation remained essentially the same. Governor Reagan insisted Anderson be allowed to participate in a three-way debate, while President Carter remained steadfastly opposed to this. As the standoff continued, the second debate was canceled, as was the vice presidential debate.

With two weeks to go to the election, the Reagan campaign decided that the best thing to do at that moment was to accede to all of President Carter's demands, including that Anderson not feature, and LWV agreed to exclude Congressman Anderson from the final debate, which was rescheduled for October 28 in Cleveland, Ohio.

The presidential debate between President Carter and Governor Reagan was moderated by Howard K. Smith and presented by the League of Women Voters. The showdown ranked among the highest ratings of any television program in the previous decade. Debate topics included the Iranian hostage crisis, and nuclear arms treaties and proliferation. Carter's campaign sought to portray Reagan as a reckless "war hawk," as well as a "dangerous right-wing radical". But it was President Carter's reference to his consultation with 12-year-old daughter Amy concerning nuclear weapons policy that became the focus of post-debate analysis and fodder for late-night television jokes. President Carter said he had asked Amy what the most important issue in that election was and she said, "the control of nuclear arms." A famous political cartoon, published the day after Reagan's landslide victory, showed Amy Carter sitting in Jimmy's lap with her shoulders shrugged asking "the economy? the hostage crisis?"

When President Carter criticized Reagan's record, which included voting against Medicare and Social Security benefits, Governor Reagan audibly sighed and replied: "There you go again".

In describing the national debt that was approaching $1 trillion, Reagan stated "a billion is a thousand millions, and a trillion is a thousand billions." When Carter would criticize the content of Reagan's campaign speeches, Reagan began his counter with the words: "Well ... I don't know that I said that. I really don't."

In his closing remarks, Reagan asked viewers: "Are you better off now than you were four years ago? Is it easier for you to go and buy things in the stores than it was four years ago? Is there more or less unemployment in the country than there was four years ago? Is America as respected throughout the world as it was? Do you feel that our security is as safe, that we're as strong as we were four years ago? And if you answer all of those questions 'yes', why then, I think your choice is very obvious as to whom you will vote for. If you don't agree, if you don't think that this course that we've been on for the last four years is what you would like to see us follow for the next four, then I could suggest another choice that you have."

After trailing Carter by 8 points among registered voters (and by 3 points among likely voters) right before their debate, Reagan moved into a 3-point lead among likely voters immediately afterward.

Endorsements
In September 1980, former Watergate scandal prosecutor Leon Jaworski accepted a position as honorary chairman of Democrats for Reagan. Five months earlier, Jaworski had harshly criticized Reagan as an "extremist"; he said after accepting the chairmanship, "I would rather have a competent extremist than an incompetent moderate."

Former Democratic Senator Eugene McCarthy of Minnesota (who in 1968 had challenged Lyndon Johnson from the left, causing the then-President to all but abdicate) endorsed Reagan.

Three days before the November 4 voting in the election, the National Rifle Association endorsed a presidential candidate for the first time in its history, backing Reagan. Reagan had received the California Rifle and Pistol Association's Outstanding Public Service Award. Carter had appointed Abner J. Mikva, a fervent proponent of gun control, to a federal judgeship and had supported the Alaska Lands Bill, closing  to hunting.

General election endorsements 

Anderson had received endorsements from:
Former officeholders
 Former Representative (Arizona's 2nd congressional district) and Interior Secretary Stewart Udall (D-AZ)
Current and former state and local officials and party officeholders
Massachusetts
 Middlesex County Sheriff John J. Buckley (D-MA)
 Former Massachusetts State Representative Francis W. Hatch Jr. (R-MA)
 Former Massachusetts Republican Party chairman Josiah Spaulding (R-MA)
Celebrities, political activists, and political commentators
Newspapers
 The Hutchinson News in Hutchinson, Kansas
 The Burlington Free Press in Burlington, VT

Carter had received endorsements from:
Newspapers
 The Des Moines Register in Des Moines, Iowa
 The Penn State Daily Collegian in State College, Pennsylvania

Commoner had received endorsements from:
Celebrities, political activists, and political commentators
 Montgomery County precinct committeeman and Consumer Party Auditor General candidate Darcy Richardson (D-PA)

DeBerry had received endorsements from:
Celebrities, political activists and political commentators
 American People's Historical Society director Bernie Sanders of Vermont

Reagan had received endorsements from:
United States Senate
Arizona Senator Dennis DeConcini (D-AZ)
Virginia Senator Harry Byrd Jr. (D-VA)
New York Senator Jacob Javits (R-NY)
Former Massachusetts Senator Edward Brooke (R-MA)
Former Minnesota Senator Eugene McCarthy (D-MN)
United States House of Representatives
 Representative (California's 12th congressional district) Pete McCloskey (R-CA)
 Former Representative (California's 26th congressional district) James Roosevelt (D-CA; son of Franklin Delano Roosevelt)
Governors and State Constitutional officers
 Former Georgia Governor Lester Maddox (D-GA)
 Former Alabama Governor John Malcolm Patterson (D-AL)
 Former Texas Governor Preston Smith (D-TX)
 Former Mississippi Governor John Bell Williams (D-MS)
Current and former state and local officials and party officeholders
Florida
 Fort Lauderdale City Advisory Board member Jim Naugle (D-FL)
New York
 Former New York State Senator Jeremiah B. Bloom (D-NY)
Celebrities, political activists and political commentators
 Former UCLA men's basketball head coach John Wooden
 Retired United States Navy Admiral Elmo Zumwalt (D-VA)
Newspaper endorsements
 The Arizona Republic in Phoenix, Arizona
 The Desert Sun in Palm Springs, California
 The Omaha World-Herald in Omaha, Nebraska
 The Quad-City Times in Davenport, Iowa
 The Record in Stockton, California
 The Repository in Canton, Ohio
 The Plain Dealer in Cleveland, Ohio
 The Blade in Toledo, Ohio
 Houston Chronicle in Houston, Texas
 Richmond Times-Dispatch in Richmond, Virginia

Results

The election was held on November 4, 1980. Ronald Reagan and running mate George H. W. Bush beat Carter by almost 10 percentage points in the popular vote. Republicans also gained control of the Senate on Reagan's coattails for the first time since 1952. The electoral college vote was a landslide, with 489 votes (representing 44 states) for Reagan and 49 for Carter (representing six states and Washington, D.C.). NBC News projected Reagan as the winner at 8:15 pm EST (5:15 PST), before voting was finished in the West, based on exit polls; it was the first time a broadcast network used exit polling to project a winner, and took the other broadcast networks by surprise. Carter conceded defeat at 9:50 pm EST. Some of Carter's advisors urged him to wait until 11:00 pm EST to allow poll results from the West Coast to come in, but Carter decided to concede earlier in order to avoid the impression that he was sulking. Speaker of the House Tip O'Neill angrily accused Carter of weakening the party's performance in the Senate elections for doing this. Carter's loss was the worst performance by an incumbent president since Herbert Hoover lost to Franklin D. Roosevelt by a margin of 18% in 1932, and his 49 electoral college votes were the fewest won by an incumbent since William Howard Taft won only 8 in 1912. Carter was the first incumbent Democrat to serve only one full term since James Buchanan and also the first to serve one full term, seek re-election, and lose since Martin Van Buren; Grover Cleveland served two non-consecutive terms while Harry S. Truman and Lyndon B. Johnson served one full term in addition to respectively taking over following the deaths of Franklin D. Roosevelt and John F. Kennedy. This was the most recent presidential election for the incumbent Democrat to lose re-election, as both Democrats Bill Clinton and Barack Obama were later respectively re-elected in 1996 and 2012, and served two full terms.

Carter carried only Georgia (his home state), Maryland, Minnesota (Mondale's home state), Hawaii, West Virginia, Rhode Island, and the District of Columbia.

John Anderson won 6.6% of the popular vote but failed to win any state outright. He found the most support in New England, fueled by liberal and moderate Republicans who felt Reagan was too far to the right and with voters who normally leaned Democratic but were dissatisfied with the policies of the Carter Administration. His best showing was in Massachusetts, where he won 15% of the popular vote. Conversely, Anderson performed worst in the South, receiving under 2% of the popular vote in South Carolina, Louisiana, Alabama, and Mississippi. Anderson claims that he was accused of spoiling the election for Carter by receiving votes that might have otherwise been cast for Carter. However, 37 percent of Anderson voters polled preferred Reagan as their second choice. Even if all Anderson votes had gone for Carter, Reagan would have still held enough majorities and pluralities to maintain 331 electoral votes.

Libertarian Party candidate Ed Clark received 921,299 popular votes (1.06%). The Libertarians succeeded in getting Clark on the ballot in all 50 states and the District of Columbia. Clark's best showing was in Alaska, where he received 11.66% of the vote. The 921,299 votes achieved by the Clark–Koch ticket was the best performance by a Libertarian presidential candidate until 2012, when the Johnson–Gray ticket received 1,273,667 votes. In addition, the popular vote percentage was the highest of a Libertarian presidential candidate until 2016, when the Johnson-Weld ticket received 3.28%.

Reagan coalition

Conspiracy theory
 
The "October Surprise conspiracy theory" alleges the existence of a plot to influence the outcome of the election. One of the leading national issues was the release of 66 Americans being held hostage in Iran since November 4, 1979. Reagan won the election. On the day of his inauguration—in fact, minutes after he concluded his 20-minute inaugural address—the Islamic Republic of Iran announced the release of the hostages. The timing gave rise to an allegation that representatives of Reagan's presidential campaign had conspired with Iran to delay the release until after the election to thwart President Jimmy Carter from pulling off an "October surprise".

Historical perspective
Reagan won 53% of the vote in reliably Democratic South Boston. His electoral college victory of 489 electoral votes (90.9% of the electoral vote) was the most lopsided electoral college victory for a first-time President-elect, with the exception of George Washington's unanimous victory in 1788. Although Reagan was to win an even greater Electoral College majority in 1984, the 1980 election nonetheless stands as the last time some currently very strong Democratic counties gave a Republican majority or plurality. Notable examples are Jefferson County in Washington State, Lane County, Oregon, Marin and Santa Cruz Counties in California, McKinley County, New Mexico, and Rock Island County, Illinois. This election is the last time a Republican won the presidency without winning Georgia. This is the first time Massachusetts voted for the Republican candidate since 1956. 1980 is one of only two occurrences of a pair of consecutive elections seeing the incumbent president defeated, the other one happening in 1892. This is the only time in the 20th century a party was voted out after a single four-year term, and the first since 1892. This would not occur again until 2020.

Survey research and post-election polling indicated that the landslide result had been more a repudiation of Carter than an embrace of Reagan and his conservatism. However, the public was aware that Reagan would move the nation in a more conservative direction, and were, apparently, willing to give it a chance to avoid four more years of Carter.

At 69 years old, Reagan was the oldest non-incumbent to win a presidential election. Thirty-six years later in 2016 this record was surpassed by Donald Trump at 70 years old. It was then surpassed again by Joe Biden who was elected at 77 years old in 2020.

Results

Source (popular vote): 

Source (electoral vote):

Results by state

Maine allowed its electoral votes to be split between candidates. Two electoral votes were awarded to the winner of the statewide race and one electoral vote to the winner of each congressional district. Reagan won all four votes.

Close states
Margin of victory less than 1% (30 electoral votes):
 Massachusetts, 0.15% (3,829 votes)
 Tennessee, 0.29% (4,710 votes)
 Arkansas, 0.61% (5,123 votes)

Margin of victory less than 5% (135 electoral votes):
 Alabama, 1.30% (17,462 votes)
 Mississippi, 1.32% (11,808 votes)
 Kentucky, 1.46% (18,857 votes)
 South Carolina, 1.53% (13,647 votes)
 Hawaii, 1.90% (5,767 votes)
 North Carolina, 2.12% (39,383 votes)
 Delaware, 2.33% (5,498 votes)
 New York, 2.67% (165,459 votes)
 Maryland, 2.96% (45,555 votes)
 Maine's 1st Congressional District, 3.15% (8,661 votes)
 Maine, 3.36% (17,548 votes)
 Maine's 2nd Congressional District, 3.73% (8,887 votes)
 Minnesota, 3.94% (80,933 votes)
 West Virginia, 4.51% (33,256 votes)
 Wisconsin, 4.72% (107,261 votes)

Margin of victory more than 5%, but less than 10% (113 electoral votes):
 Louisiana, 5.45% (84,400 votes)
 Vermont, 5.96% (12,707 votes)
 Michigan, 6.49% (253,693 votes)
 Missouri, 6.81% (142,999 votes)
 Pennsylvania, 7.11% (324,332 votes)
 Illinois, 7.93% (376,636 votes) (tipping-point state)
 Connecticut, 9.64% (135,478 votes)
 Oregon, 9.66% (114,154 votes)

Statistics 

Counties with highest percentage of the vote (Republican)
 Banner County, Nebraska 90.41%
 Madison County, Idaho 88.41%
 McIntosh County, North Dakota 86.01%
 McPherson County, South Dakota 85.60%
 Franklin County, Idaho 85.31%

Counties with highest percentage of the vote (Democratic)
 Macon County, Alabama 80.10%
 Hancock County, Georgia 78.50%
 Duval County, Texas 77.91%
 Jefferson County, Mississippi 77.84%
 Greene County, Alabama 77.09%

Counties with highest percentage of the vote (Other)
 Nantucket, Massachusetts 21.63%
 Winnebago County, Illinois 21.50%
 Dukes County, Massachusetts 20.88%
 Pitkin County, Colorado 20.82%
 Story County, Iowa 19.41%

Voter demographics

Source: CBS News and The New York Times exit poll from the Roper Center for Public Opinion Research (15,201 surveyed)

See also

 1980 United States House of Representatives elections
 1980 United States gubernatorial elections
 History of the United States (1964–1980)
 History of the United States (1980–1991)
 Anderson v. Celebrezze
 Political activities of the Koch brothers
 Debategate per allegations of Carter's briefing books being leaked to Reagan campaign prior to their debate

References

Further reading

Books
 . online review by Michael Barone
 Davies, Gareth, and Julian E. Zelizer, eds. America at the Ballot Box: Elections and Political History (2015) pp. 196–218.
 
 
 
 Hogue, Andrew P. Stumping God: Reagan, Carter, and the Invention of a Political Faith (Baylor University Press; 2012) 343 pages; A study of religious rhetoric in the campaign
 Johnstone, Andrew, and Andrew Priest, eds.  US Presidential Elections and Foreign Policy: Candidates, Campaigns, and Global Politics from FDR to Bill Clinton (2017) pp 250–270.  online
 Mason, Jim (2011). No Holding Back: The 1980 John B. Anderson Presidential Campaign. Lanham, MD: University Press of America. .
 
 . online review by Lou Cannon
 Stanley, Timothy. Kennedy vs. Carter: The 1980 Battle for the Democratic Party's Soul (University Press of Kansas, 2010) 298 pages. A revisionist history of the 1970s and their political aftermath that argues that Ted Kennedy's 1980 campaign was more popular than has been acknowledged; describes his defeat by Jimmy Carter in terms of a "historical accident" rather than perceived radicalism.

Journal articles

Newspaper articles

External links
 The Election Wall's 1980 Election Video Page
 1980 popular vote by counties
 1980 popular vote by states
 1980 popular vote by states (with bar graphs)
 Campaign commercials from the 1980 election
 —Michael Sheppard, Massachusetts Institute of Technology
  Portrayal of 1980 presidential elections in the U.S. by the Soviet television
 Election of 1980 in Counting the Votes 

 
1980 United States Presidential Election
1980
Ronald Reagan
Jimmy Carter
Walter Mondale
George H. W. Bush
November 1980 events in the United States